Dickson County is a county located in the U.S. state of Tennessee. As of the 2020 census, the population was 54,315. Its county seat is Charlotte. Dickson County is part of the Nashville-Davidson–Murfreesboro–Franklin, TN Metropolitan Statistical Area. Dickson County is home to Tennessee's oldest courthouse in continuous use, built in 1835. This is the second courthouse in Charlotte as the first one, a log building, was destroyed in the Tornado of 1833, which destroyed all but one building on the courthouse square.

History
October 25, 1803 the Tennessee General Assembly passed a bill creating Dickson County, the 25th of Tennessee's 95 counties. It was formed from parts of Montgomery and Robertson counties, and was named for William Dickson, a Nashville physician then serving in the United States Congress. Dickson never lived in the county, but his relatives were prominent in its early development. Dickson was a close friend of President Andrew Jackson.

General James Robertson built the first iron works in west Tennessee in Dickson County. Robertson sold his furnace in 1804 to Montgomery Bell who later sold it to Anthony Wayne Van Leer(1769–1855), who the town Vanleer, TN is named after.

The Ruskin Colony and The Coming Nation

 The Ruskin Colony (or Ruskin Commonwealth Association) was a 250-member, utopian socialist cooperative established in Dickson County in 1894. Initially located near Tennessee City, it relocated to what is now Ruskin. Internal conflict had brought about the dissolution of the colony by 1899.

The Coming Nation, a socialist communalist paper established by Julius Augustus Wayland in Greensburg, Indiana, was relocated to the Ruskin Colony. It was the forerunner of the Appeal to Reason, which later became a weekly political newspaper published in the American Midwest from 1895 until 1922. The Appeal to Reason was known for its politics, giving support to the Farmers' Alliance and People's Party, before becoming a mainstay of the Socialist Party of America following its establishment in 1901. Using a network of highly motivated volunteers known as the "Appeal Army" to increase its subscription sales, the Appeal paid circulation climbed to over a quarter million by 1906, and half a million by 1910, making it the largest-circulation socialist newspaper in American history.

U.S. Route 70

In July 1917, a mass meeting was held in the Alamo Theatre in Dickson to raise $760 (equivalent to $25,000 in 2016) to pay for the surveying of the Bristol to Memphis Highway through Dickson County. The money was raised in less than 15 minutes by donations from those present at the meeting. State highway surveyors began surveying the route on August 14, 1917. The building of this highway put the county along the route known as the “Broadway of America,” Highway 70.

Governor Frank G. Clement

On November 4, 1952, Frank G. Clement (1920–1969) of Dickson was elected Governor of Tennessee. He served as governor from 1953 to 1959, and again from 1963 to 1967.  Known for his energetic speaking ability, he delivered the keynote address at the 1956 Democratic National Convention.  The Hotel Halbrook, where Clement was born, still stands in Dickson, and has been listed on the National Register of Historic Places. Today the Hotel operates as the Clement Railroad Hotel Museum.

Geography

Dickson County is bordered on the northeast by the Cumberland River. The Harpeth River passes along the county's eastern border.

Adjacent counties
Montgomery County (north)
Cheatham County (east)
Williamson County (southeast)
Hickman County (south)
Humphreys County (southwest)
Houston County (northwest)

State protected areas
Cheatham Lake Wildlife Management Area (part)
Hotel Halbrook Railroad and Local History Museum (state historic site)
Montgomery Bell State Natural Area
Montgomery Bell State Park

Demographics

2020 census

As of the 2020 United States census, there were 54,315 people, 19,198 households, and 13,030 families residing in the county.

2000 census
As of the census of 2000, there were 43,156 people, 16,473 households, and 12,173 families residing in the county.  The population density was 88 people per square mile (34/km2).  There were 17,614 housing units at an average density of 36 per square mile (14/km2).  The racial makeup of the county was 93.25% European American, 4.58% Black or African American, 0.40% Native American, 0.27% Asian, 0.01% Pacific Islander, 0.47% from other races, and 1.01% from two or more races.  1.12% of the population were Hispanic or Latino of any race.

There were 16,473 households, out of which 35.60% had children under the age of 18 living with them, 58.30% were married couples living together, 11.50% had a female householder with no husband present, and 26.10% were non-families. 22.30% of all households were made up of individuals, and 8.90% had someone living alone who was 65 years of age or older.  The average household size was 2.59 and the average family size was 3.02.

In the county, the population was spread out, with 26.60% under the age of 18, 8.10% from 18 to 24, 30.70% from 25 to 44, 22.90% from 45 to 64, and 11.70% who were 65 years of age or older.  The median age was 36 years. For every 100 females, there were 96.20 males.  For every 100 females age 18 and over, there were 92.90 males.

The median income for a household in the county was $39,056, and the median income for a family was $45,575. Males had a median income of $32,252 versus $23,686 for females. The per capita income for the county was $18,043.  About 8.10% of families and 10.20% of the population were below the poverty line, including 12.90% of those under age 18 and 11.80% of those age 65 or over.

By 2005 the county had a population that was 92.0% non-Hispanic white, 4.4% African-American and 1.7% Latino.

Government 
Historically, Dickson County has been a Democratic stronghold; Ulysses Grant carried it in 1868, but after that, it did not vote Republican again until Nixon's 1972 landslide. It has trended powerfully Republican starting in the beginning of the 21st century. An early sign of this could be seen in its back-to-back votes for Reagan in 1984 and George H. W. Bush in 1988, even though it had generally voted Democratic in elections in which the Democratic nominee was losing substantially worse nationally than Dukakis was in 1988 (for example, giving Adlai Stevenson over 70% of its vote in both of his runs). Not only this, but George H. W. Bush was even able to slightly improve on Reagan's vote share, despite the small national swing towards the Democrats in 1988.

However, in the subsequent three elections, Bill Clinton recaptured the county by double digit margins, and Tennessee native Al Gore carried it by over 8%. In 2004, it switched to giving George W. Bush a 10.2% margin, however, and, as of 2020, has voted Republican in every subsequent election, giving the Republican nominee an increased vote share every time. Neither Hillary Clinton in 2016 nor Delaware native Joe Biden in 2020 was able to reach so much as a third of the county's vote.

County Commission 
The 12-member county commission is the legislative body of Dickson County. One commissioner is elected from each of the county's 12 commission districts. The county mayor chairs the commission.

Responsibilities 
Commissioners are charged with appropriating funds for the county departments, setting the property tax rate and creating personnel policies for county employees.

Terms 
The commissioners are chosen in the August general elections and serve four-year terms. These elections coincide with the state's gubernatorial primaries and begin September 1 of each non-presidential even-numbered year.

Commission meetings 
The county commission meets for a work session the first Monday evening of each month. Regular sessions are held the third Monday evening of each month. At this meeting, matters are brought before the commission for action. When meeting dates fall on holidays, the meeting is generally held the next evening.

Current Commissioners

County Officials 
Dickson County has various elected officials to carry out the necessary duties of the county government.

Elected officials are chosen in the August general elections, along with commissioners, and serve four-year terms. These elections coincide with the state's gubernatorial primaries and begin September 1 of each non-presidential even-numbered year.

Department Heads 
The Mayor appoints citizens to lead county government departments, subject to approval by the County Commission.

Judicial Branch Officials 
The judicial officials are chosen in the August general elections, along with other elected officials and county commissioners, and serve four-year terms (with the exception of the General Sessions Judge, who serves an eight-year term, with elections coinciding with every other gubernatorial primary). These elections coincide with the state's gubernatorial primaries and begin September 1 of each non-presidential even-numbered year.  All Dickson County elected offices are nonpartisan.

Education
The Dickson County School District serves the entirety of the county. Since 2012, the current Director of Schools is Dr. Danny L. Weeks.

Serving around 8,500 students, the Dickson County School System ranks 23rd in student population among 142 school districts in Tennessee. The District employs around 1,200 people.

Board of Education
The Board of Education is elected to govern the education system in Dickson County, through setting its budget, planning for future developments, and setting policies. The Board meets every 4th Thursday of the month.

The Board also chooses the Director of Schools. Each member represents one of the six districts.  Each district is composed of two county commission districts.

History
Prior to the 1920s, numerous private high schools and colleges existed in Dickson County. These included the Tracy Academy, Charlotte Female School, Alexander Campbell School, Edgewood Academy and Normal College, the Dickson Academy, Dickson Normal School (where Hattie Carraway, the first woman elected to the U.S. Senate, was educated), Glenwylde Academy, and Ruskin Cave College. Most of these closed before or during the Great Depression.  As is typical of most Tennessee counties, all public schools of the county are currently operated by a single county-wide school district.

Schools 
 Dickson County Schools operate 14 schools.

Elementary

 Centennial Elementary School
 Charlotte Elementary School
 Dickson Elementary School
 Oakmont Elementary School
 The Discovery School
Sullivan Central Elementary School
 Stuart-Burns Elementary School
 Vanleer Elementary School
 White Bluff Elementary School

Middle

 Charlotte Middle School
 Burns Middle School 
 Dickson Middle School
 William James Middle School

High

 Creek Wood High School
 Dickson County High School

Alternative School

 New Directions Academy

Higher Education 
Dickson is home to three campuses for higher education.

The Tennessee College of Applied Technology – Dickson, under the Tennessee Board of Regents, provides career and technical education programs. Some programs include administrative office technology, automotive technology, computer information technology, cosmetology, various health programs (dental, nursing, etc.), digital graphic design, HVAC/refrigeration, mechatronics, and welding, among many others.

Nashville State Community College maintains a satellite campus in Dickson at the Renaissance Center, offering associate degrees to prepare students to transfer to four-year universities or enter the workforce.

Freed Hardeman University owns the Renaissance Center but shares it with NSCC, offering bachelor's degrees in accounting, business management, elementary education, nursing (BSN), psychology, and social work.

Communities

City
Dickson

Towns
Burns
Charlotte (county seat)
Slayden
Vanleer
White Bluff

Unincorporated communities
 Abiff
Bellsburg
Cumberland Furnace
Promise Land
Tennessee City

See also
National Register of Historic Places listings in Dickson County, Tennessee

References

External links

 Official site
 Dickson County Government 
 Dickson County Chamber of Commerce
 Dickson County Schools
 Dickson County, TNGenWeb – genealogy resources

 
1803 establishments in Tennessee
Populated places established in 1803
Nashville metropolitan area
Middle Tennessee